Dysschema umbra is a moth of the family Erebidae. It was described by Herbert Druce in 1885. It is found in El Salvador.

References

Dysschema
Moths described in 1885